Government Higher Secondary School Rajakkad, Kerala, India, was started in 1955. The school is situated in rajakkad about 20 kilometer away from Adimali town. Rajakkad Temple and Christhuraja Church are two religious centers near to school.

There are nine buildings for the school. School office, lab, library, higher secondary lab etc. works in the main block. In the higher secondary there are science, commerce and humanities batches.

History
GHSS Rajakkad is situated Rajakkad Town. Rajakkad is a village in Idukki district in the Indian state of Kerala situated in the Western Ghats. Rajakkad Is One Of The Fastest Growing Towns In Kerala.

The high school was started in 1955. The school was recognized by the Higher Secondary Department Of Kerala Government.

Result
When Plus Two course was started in Kerala, a plus two batch was sanctioned for the school.

External links

High schools and secondary schools in Kerala
Schools in Idukki district
Educational institutions established in 1955
1955 establishments in India